Sheryl Delozier is a Republican member of the Pennsylvania House of Representatives, first elected to represent the 88th Legislative District in November 2008.

Career
Before winning an Assembly seat, Delozier worked in several facets of state government.  She started in the state Auditor General's office, then moved on to a position with former Governor Tom Ridge's transition team.  She continued on in the Ridge and Schweiker Administrations.  Her most recent appointment was with the Pennsylvania Public Utility Commission.

Delozier currently sits on the Children & Youth, Consumer Affairs, and Rules committees.

Personal
Delozier graduated from West Chester East High School and the University of Delaware with a degree in political science and a concentration in domestic government.  She went on to the Open University of the Netherlands, where she studied international business in European markets, and later to the Pennsylvania State University, where she received her master's degree in management in business administration.

References

External links
Representative Sheryl Delozier's Official Web Site
PA House Profile

1967 births
21st-century American politicians
21st-century American women politicians
Living people
Republican Party members of the Pennsylvania House of Representatives
Women state legislators in Pennsylvania